"Portrait of My Love" is a song written by Norman Newell and Cyril Ornadel, which was released by Matt Monro in 1960, and was an international hit for Steve Lawrence in 1961.

Matt Monro version
In 1960, Matt Monro released the song as a single. The song was Monro's first hit single, and spent 16 weeks on the UK's Record Retailer chart, reaching No. 3, also reaching No. 3 on the UK's New Musical Express chart. In 1961, the song was released on Monro's album My Kind of Girl.

Charts

Steve Lawrence version

In 1961, Steve Lawrence released a version of the song as a single and on the album Portrait of My Love. Lawrence's version became an international hit and spent 16 weeks on the Billboard Hot 100 chart, peaking at No. 9, while reaching No. 1 in the Philippines, No. 7 in Australia, and No. 9 on Canada's CHUM Hit Parade.

Lawrence's version was ranked No. 30 on Billboards end of year "Hot 100 for 1961 - Top Sides of the Year" and No. 81 on Cash Boxs "Top 100 Chart Hits of 1961".

In 1962, Steve Lawrence was nominated for a Grammy Award for Best Male Pop Vocal Performance for his rendition of "Portrait of My Love".

Awards
In 1961, the song won songwriters Norman Newell and Cyril Ornadel the British Songwriters Guild's Ivor Novello Award for "Outstanding Song of 1960".

In 1999, the song was honored at the BMI Awards in London for having 2 million radio plays.

Other versions
In 1965, the song became the theme of a Filipino film by the same title, released by Sampaguita Pictures and starring Eddie Gutierrez and Susan Roces.
In 1967, the Tokens released a cover version of the song as a single. Their version spent eight weeks on the Billboard Hot 100, reaching No. 36, while reaching No. 25 on the Cash Box Top 100, No. 34 on Record Worlds "100 Top Pops", and No. 46 on Canada's RPM 100.
In 2005, Rick Astley released a cover of the song for his sixth studio album, Portrait.

References

1960 songs
1960 singles
1961 singles
1967 singles
Matt Monro songs
Steve Lawrence songs
Parlophone singles
United Artists Records singles
The Tokens songs
Songs with lyrics by Norman Newell
Songs written by Cyril Ornadel